The 2015 Abierto Mexicano Telcel was a professional tennis tournament played on outdoor hard courts. It was the 22nd edition of the men's tournament (15th for the women), and part of the 2015 ATP World Tour and the 2015 WTA Tour. It took place in Acapulco, Mexico between 23 and 28 February 2015, at the Fairmont Acapulco Princess.

Points and prize money

Point distribution

Prize money 

1 Qualifiers prize money is also the Round of 32 prize money
* per team

ATP singles main-draw entrants

Seeds

1 Rankings as of February 16, 2015.

Other entrants
The following players received wildcards into the main draw:
  Kevin Anderson
  Daniel Garza
  Santiago Giraldo

The following players received entry from the qualifying draw:
  Alejandro González
  Ryan Harrison
  Thanasi Kokkinakis
  Austin Krajicek

Withdrawals
Before the tournament
  Marin Čilić → replaced by  Viktor Troicki
  Radek Štěpánek → replaced by  Dustin Brown
  Janko Tipsarević → replaced by  Ivan Dodig

Retirements
  Donald Young (left elbow injury)

ATP doubles main-draw entrants

Seeds

1 Rankings as of February 16, 2015.

Other entrants
The following pairs received wildcards into the main draw:
  Tigre Hank /  Manuel Sánchez
  César Ramírez /  Miguel Ángel Reyes-Varela

The following pair received entry from the qualifying draw:
  Dustin Brown /  Tobias Kamke

WTA singles main-draw entrants

Seeds

1 Rankings as of February 16, 2015.

Other entrants
The following players received wildcards into the main draw:
  Marie Bouzková
  Ana Sofía Sánchez
  Marcela Zacarías

The following players received entry from the qualifying draw:
  Elena Bogdan
  Louisa Chirico
  Richèl Hogenkamp 
  Lucie Hradecká

The following players received entry as lucky losers:
  Mariana Duque Mariño
  Sesil Karatantcheva

Withdrawals
Before the tournament
  Irina-Camelia Begu (rib injury) → replaced by  Mariana Duque Mariño
  Jana Čepelová → replaced by  Shelby Rogers
  Daniela Hantuchová (right foot injury) → replaced by  Sesil Karatantcheva
  Madison Keys → replaced by  Kiki Bertens
  Karin Knapp → replaced by  Polona Hercog
  Christina McHale → replaced by  Johanna Larsson
  Monica Niculescu → replaced by  María Teresa Torró Flor
  Alison Riske → replaced by  Madison Brengle
  Sílvia Soler Espinosa → replaced by  Aleksandra Krunić
  Zhang Shuai → replaced by  Anna Karolína Schmiedlová

During the tournament
  Maria Sharapova (stomach virus)

Retirements
  Mirjana Lučić-Baroni (viral illness)
  Roberta Vinci (right shoulder injury)

WTA doubles main-draw entrants

Seeds

1 Rankings as of February 16, 2015.

Other entrants
The following pair received wildcards into the main draw:
  Carolina Betancourt /  Adriana Guzmán

Retirements
  Lauren Davis (left abdominal injury)

Finals

Men's singles

  David Ferrer defeated  Kei Nishikori, 6–3, 7–5

Women's singles

  Timea Bacsinszky defeated  Caroline Garcia, 6–3, 6–0

Men's doubles

  Ivan Dodig /  Marcelo Melo defeated  Mariusz Fyrstenberg /  Santiago González, 7–6(7–2), 5–7, [10–3]

Women's doubles

  Lara Arruabarrena /  María Teresa Torró Flor defeated  Andrea Hlaváčková /  Lucie Hradecká, 7–6(7–2), 5–7, [13–11]

References

External links
Official Website